Edward F. Cahill was an American football and basketball coach.

Early years
Cahill was a graduate of St. Mary's College in Kansas, where he was a varsity athlete. He enrolled at the Saint Louis University School of Medicine until leaving to serve in World War I.

Saint John's (Minnesota)
Cahill served as the head football and men's basketball coach at Saint John's University in Collegeville, Minnesota during the 1920–21 and 1921–22 academic years.

Carroll (Montana)
Cahill later served as the head football coach and head men's basketball coach at Carroll University (then known as Mount St. Charles College) in Helena, Montana during the 1922-23 academic year.

Head coaching record

Football

References

Year of birth missing
Year of death missing
Carroll Fighting Saints football coaches
Carroll Fighting Saints men's basketball coaches
Saint Louis University alumni
Saint Mary Spires football players
Saint John's Johnnies basketball coaches
Saint John's Johnnies football coaches